is a single released by Gackt on March 8, 2000, under Nippon Crown. It peaked at seventh place on the Oricon weekly chart and charted for six weeks.

Track listing

References

2000 singles
Gackt songs